Alonzo Andretti T. Muhlach (born February 19, 2010) is a Filipino child actor who is best known for his role as Prinsipe Vladimir in My Big Bossing segment: Prinsesa. In January 2017, he joined the first season of Your Face Sounds Familiar Kids on ABS-CBN.

Early life
Alonzo was born on February 19, 2010, in Manila, Philippines. He is the son of the former child actor Niño Muhlach. Aga Muhlach and AJ Muhlach are his father's first cousins. His great-aunt is postwar movie star Amalia Fuentes and his great-grandmother is famed prewar actress Nela Álvarez.

Career
In 2014, Muhlach is best known for his first film, My Big Bossing as Prinsipe Vladimir.

In 2015, Muhlach made his second film, Wang Fam as Vey Wang.

In later 2015, Muhlach created his third film, Beauty and the Bestie he played Jumbo Villaviencio and the movie was an ultimate success.

Later 2016, Muhlach made his fourth film, Enteng Kabisote 10 and the Abangers he played Benokis, grandson of Enteng.

Filmography

Television

Film

Awards

References

External links
 Official Facebook Page

2010 births
Living people
21st-century Filipino male actors
Filipino male child actors
Male actors from Metro Manila
Alonzo
People from Manila
Star Magic
Viva Artists Agency